Hasina Aur Nagina is a Bollywood film directed and produced by Gautam Bhatia. It was released in 1996 and stars Sadashiv Amrapurkar, Jagdeep, Kiran Kumar and Ekta Sohini.

Plot
After the murder of the parents, two sisters became separated. Years later they meet and hunt for the murderers.

Cast

Music
"Tu Mera Raja Main Teri" - Sarika Kapoor, Simi Sinha
"Jay Shiv Shankar" - Sarika Kapoor
"Mai Hu Ek Hasina" - Kavita Krishnamurthy, Shobha Joshi
"Mai Tera Raja Tu Meri" - Sadhana Sargam, Nitin Mukesh
"Meri Shishe Wali" - Sadhana Sargam
"Mujhe Ishq Ka Rog" - Shobha Joshi, Mangal Singh

References

External links
 

1996 films
1990s Hindi-language films
Films scored by Dilip Sen-Sameer Sen